

Events

Pre-1600
AD 51 – Nero, later to become Roman emperor, is given the title princeps iuventutis (head of the youth).
 306 – Martyrdom of Saint Adrian of Nicomedia.
 852 – Croatian Knez Trpimir I issues a statute, a document with the first known written mention of the Croats name in Croatian sources.
 938 – Translation of the relics of martyr Wenceslaus I, Duke of Bohemia, Prince of the Czechs.
1152 – Frederick I Barbarossa is elected King of Germany.
1238 – The Battle of the Sit River begins two centuries of Mongol horde domination of Russia.
1351 – Ramathibodi becomes King of Siam.
1386 – Władysław II Jagiełło (Jogaila) is crowned King of Poland.
1461 – Wars of the Roses in England: Lancastrian King Henry VI is deposed by his House of York cousin, who then becomes King Edward IV.
1493 – Explorer Christopher Columbus arrives back in Lisbon, Portugal, aboard his ship Niña from his voyage to what are now The Bahamas and other islands in the Caribbean.
1519 – Hernán Cortés arrives in Mexico in search of the Aztec civilization and its wealth.

1601–1900
1628 – The Massachusetts Bay Colony is granted a Royal charter.
1665 – English King Charles II declares war on the Netherlands marking the start of the Second Anglo-Dutch War.
1675 – John Flamsteed is appointed the first Astronomer Royal of England.
1681 – Charles II grants a land charter to William Penn for the area that will later become Pennsylvania.
 1769 – Mozart departed Italy after the last of his three tours there.
1776 – American Revolutionary War: The Continental Army fortifies Dorchester Heights with cannon, leading the British troops to abandon the Siege of Boston.
1789 – In New York City, the first Congress of the United States meets, putting the United States Constitution into effect. 
1790 – France is divided into 83 départements, cutting across the former provinces in an attempt to dislodge regional loyalties based on ownership of land by the nobility.
  1791   – Vermont is admitted to the United States as the fourteenth state.
1794 – The 11th Amendment to the U.S. Constitution is passed by the U.S. Congress.
1797 – John Adams is inaugurated as the 2nd President of the United States of America, becoming the first President to begin his presidency on March 4.
1804 – Castle Hill Rebellion: Irish convicts rebel against British colonial authority in the Colony of New South Wales.
1813 – Cyril VI of Constantinople is elected Ecumenical Patriarch of Constantinople.
1814 – Americans defeat British forces at the Battle of Longwoods between London, Ontario and Thamesville, near present-day Wardsville, Ontario.
1837 – The city of Chicago is incorporated.
1848 – Carlo Alberto di Savoia signs the Statuto Albertino that will later represent the first constitution of the Regno d'Italia.
1849 – President-elect of the United States Zachary Taylor and Vice President-elect Millard Fillmore did not take their respective oaths of office (they did so the following day), leading to the erroneous theory that outgoing President pro tempore of the United States Senate David Rice Atchison had assumed the role of acting president for one day.
1861 – The first national flag of the Confederate States of America (the "Stars and Bars") is adopted.
1865 – The third and final national flag of the Confederate States of America is adopted by the Confederate Congress.
1878 – Pope Leo XIII reestablishes the Catholic Church in Scotland, recreating sees and naming bishops for the first time since 1603.
1882 – Britain's first electric trams run in east London.

1901–present
1901 – McKinley inaugurated president for second time; Theodore Roosevelt is vice president. 
1908 – The Collinwood school fire, Collinwood near Cleveland, Ohio, kills 174 people.
1909 – U.S. President William Taft used what became known as a Saxbe fix, a mechanism to avoid the restriction of the U.S. Constitution's Ineligibility Clause, to appoint Philander C. Knox as U.S. Secretary of State.
1913 – First Balkan War: The Greek army engages the Turks at Bizani, resulting in victory two days later.
  1913   – The United States Department of Labor is formed.
1917 – Jeannette Rankin of Montana becomes the first female member of the United States House of Representatives.
1933 – Franklin D. Roosevelt becomes the 32nd President of the United States. He was the last president to be inaugurated on March 4.
  1933   – Frances Perkins becomes United States Secretary of Labor, the first female member of the United States Cabinet.
  1933   – The Parliament of Austria is suspended because of a quibble over procedure – Chancellor Engelbert Dollfuss initiates an authoritarian rule by decree.
1941 – World War II: The United Kingdom launches Operation Claymore on the Lofoten Islands; the first large scale British Commando raid.
1943 – World War II: The Battle of the Bismarck Sea in the south-west Pacific comes to an end.
  1943   – World War II: The Battle of Fardykambos, one of the first major battles between the Greek Resistance and the occupying Royal Italian Army, begins. It ends on 6 March with the surrender of an entire Italian battalion and the liberation of the town of Grevena.
1944 – World War II: After the success of Big Week, the USAAF begins a daylight bombing campaign of Berlin.
1955 – An order to protect the endangered Saimaa ringed seal (Pusa hispida saimensis) was legalized.
1957 – The S&P 500 stock market index is introduced, replacing the S&P 90.
1960 – The French freighter La Coubre explodes in Havana, Cuba, killing 100.
1962 – A Caledonian Airways Douglas DC-7 crashes shortly after takeoff from Cameroon, killing 111 – the worst crash of a DC-7.
1966 – A Canadian Pacific Air Lines DC-8-43 explodes on landing at Tokyo International Airport, killing 64 people.
  1966   – In an interview in the London Evening Standard, The Beatles' John Lennon declares that the band is "more popular than Jesus now".
1970 – French submarine Eurydice explodes underwater, resulting in the loss of the entire 57-man crew.
1976 – The Northern Ireland Constitutional Convention is formally dissolved in Northern Ireland resulting in direct rule of Northern Ireland from London by the British parliament.
1977 – The 1977 Vrancea earthquake in eastern and southern Europe kills more than 1,500, mostly in Bucharest, Romania.
1980 – Nationalist leader Robert Mugabe wins a sweeping election victory to become Zimbabwe's first black prime minister.
1985 – The Food and Drug Administration approves a blood test for HIV infection, used since then for screening all blood donations in the United States.
1986 – The Soviet Vega 1 begins returning images of Halley's Comet and the first images of its nucleus.
1990 – American basketball player Hank Gathers dies after collapsing during the semifinals of a West Coast Conference tournament game.
  1990   – Lennox Sebe, President for life of the South African Bantustan of Ciskei, is ousted from power in a bloodless military coup led by Brigadier Oupa Gqozo.
1994 – Space Shuttle program: the Space Shuttle Columbia is launched on STS-62.
1996 – A derailed train in Weyauwega, Wisconsin (USA) causes the emergency evacuation of 2,300 people for 16 days.
1998 – Gay rights: Oncale v. Sundowner Offshore Services, Inc.: The Supreme Court of the United States rules that federal laws banning on-the-job sexual harassment also apply when both parties are the same sex.
2001 – BBC bombing: A massive car bomb explodes in front of the BBC Television Centre in London, seriously injuring one person; the attack was attributed to the Real IRA.
2002 – Afghanistan: Seven American Special Operations Forces soldiers and 200 Al-Qaeda Fighters are killed as American forces attempt to infiltrate the Shah-i-Kot Valley on a low-flying helicopter reconnaissance mission.
2009 – The International Criminal Court (ICC) issues an arrest warrant for Sudanese President Omar Hassan al-Bashir for war crimes and crimes against humanity in Darfur. Al-Bashir is the first sitting head of state to be indicted by the ICC since its establishment in 2002.
2012 – A series of explosions is reported at a munitions dump in Brazzaville, the capital of the Republic of the Congo, killing at least 250 people.
2015 – At least 34 miners die in a suspected gas explosion at the Zasyadko coal mine in the rebel-held Donetsk region of Ukraine.
2018 – Former MI6 spy Sergei Skripal and his daughter are poisoned with a Novichok nerve agent in Salisbury, England, causing a diplomatic uproar that results in mass-expulsions of diplomats from all countries involved.
2020 – Nik Wallenda becomes the first person to walk on the Masaya Volcano in Nicaragua.

Births

Pre-1600
 895 – Liu Zhiyuan, founder of the Later Han Dynasty (d. 948)
 977 – Al-Musabbihi, Fatimid historian and official (d. 1030)
1188 – Blanche of Castile, French queen consort (d. 1252)
1394 – Henry the Navigator, Portuguese explorer (d. 1460)
1484 – George, margrave of Brandenburg-Ansbach (d. 1543)
1492 – Francesco de Layolle, Italian organist and composer (d. 1540)
1502 – Elisabeth of Hesse, princess of Saxony (d. 1557)
1519 – Hindal Mirza, Mughal emperor (d. 1551)
1526 – Henry Carey, 1st Baron Hunsdon (d. 1596)

1601–1900
1602 – Kanō Tan'yū, Japanese painter (d. 1674)
1634 – Kazimierz Łyszczyński, Polish philosopher (d. 1689)
1651 – John Somers, 1st Baron Somers, English lawyer, jurist, and politician, Lord High Chancellor of Great Britain (d. 1716)
1655 – Fra Galgario, Italian painter (d. 1743)
1665 – Philip Christoph von Königsmarck, Swedish soldier (d. 1694)
1678 – Antonio Vivaldi, Italian violinist and composer (d. 1741)
1702 – Jack Sheppard, English criminal (d. 1724)
1706 – Lauritz de Thurah, Danish architect, designed the Hermitage Hunting Lodge and Gammel Holtegård (d. 1759)
1715 – James Waldegrave, 2nd Earl Waldegrave, English historian and politician (d. 1763)
1719 – George Pigot, 1st Baron Pigot, English politician (d. 1777)
1729 – Anne d'Arpajon, French wife of Philippe de Noailles (d. 1794)
1745 – Charles Dibdin, English actor, playwright, and composer (d. 1814)
  1745   – Casimir Pulaski, Polish-American general (d. 1779)
1756 – Henry Raeburn, Scottish portrait painter (d. 1823)
1760 – William Payne, English painter (d. 1830)
  1760   – Hugh Ronalds, British nurseryman who cultivated and documented 300 varieties of apples (d. 1833)
1769 – Muhammad Ali, Ottoman military leader and pasha (d. 1849)
1770 – Joseph Jacotot, French philosopher and academic (d. 1840)
1778 – Robert Emmet, Irish republican (d. 1803)
1781 – Rebecca Gratz, American educator and philanthropist (d. 1869)
1782 – Johann Rudolf Wyss, Swiss philosopher, author, and academic (d. 1830)
1792 – Isaac Lea, American conchologist, geologist, and publisher (d. 1886)
1793 – Karl Lachmann, German philologist and critic (d. 1851)
1800 – William Price, Welsh physician, Chartist, and neo-Druid (d. 1893)
1814 – Napoleon Collins, Rear Admiral of the United States Navy during the Mexican–American War and the American Civil War (d. 1875)
1815 – Mykhailo Verbytsky, Ukrainian composer of religious hymns and the national anthem of Ukraine (d. 1870)
1817 – Edwards Pierrepont, American lawyer and politician, 34th United States Attorney General (d. 1892)
1820 – Francesco Bentivegna, Italian rebel leader (d. 1856)
1822 – Jules Antoine Lissajous, French mathematician and academic (d. 1880)
1823 – George Caron, Canadian businessman and politician (d. 1902)
1826 – August Johann Gottfried Bielenstein, German linguist, ethnographer, and theologian (d. 1907)
  1826   – John Buford, American general (d. 1863)
  1826   – Elme Marie Caro, French philosopher and academic (d. 1887)
  1826   – Theodore Judah, American engineer, founded the Central Pacific Railroad (d. 1863)
1828 – Owen Wynne Jones, Welsh clergyman and poet (d. 1870)
1838 – Paul Lacôme, French pianist, cellist, and composer (d. 1920)
1847 – Carl Josef Bayer, Austrian chemist and academic (d. 1904)
1851 – Alexandros Papadiamantis, Greek author and poet (d. 1911)
1854 – Napier Shaw, English meteorologist and academic (d. 1945)
1856 – Alfred William Rich, English painter, author, and educator (d. 1921)
1861 – Arthur Cushman McGiffert, American theologian and author (d. 1933)
1862 – Jacob Robert Emden, Swiss astrophysicist and meteorologist (d. 1940)
1863 – R. I. Pocock, English zoologist and archaeologist (d. 1947)
  1863   – John Henry Wigmore, American academic and jurist (d. 1943)
1864 – David W. Taylor, American admiral, architect, and engineer (d. 1940)
1866 – Eugène Cosserat, French mathematician and astronomer (d. 1931)
1867 – Jacob L. Beilhart, American activist, founded the Spirit Fruit Society (d. 1908)
  1867   – Charles Pelot Summerall, American Army officer (d. 1955)
1870 – Thomas Sturge Moore, English author and poet (d. 1944)
1871 – Boris Galerkin, Russian mathematician and engineer (d. 1945)
1873 – Guy Wetmore Carryl, American journalist and poet (d. 1904)
  1873   – John H. Trumbull, American colonel and politician, 70th Governor of Connecticut (d. 1961)
1875 – Mihály Károlyi, Hungarian politician, President of Hungary (d. 1955)
  1875   – Enrique Larreta, Argentinian historian and author (d. 1961)
1876 – Léon-Paul Fargue, French poet and author (d. 1947)
  1876   – Theodore Hardeen, Hungarian-American magician (d. 1945)
1877 – Alexander Goedicke, Russian pianist and composer (d. 1957)
  1877   – Fritz Graebner, German geographer and ethnologist (d. 1934)
  1877   – Garrett Morgan, African-American inventor (d. 1963)
1878 – Takeo Arishima, Japanese author and critic (d. 1923)
  1878   – Egbert Van Alstyne, American pianist and songwriter (d. 1951)
1879 – Bernhard Kellermann, German author and poet (d. 1951)
1880 – Channing Pollock, American playwright and critic (d. 1946)
1881 – Todor Aleksandrov, Bulgarian educator and activist (d. 1924)
  1881   – Thomas Sigismund Stribling, American lawyer and author (d. 1965)
  1881   – Richard C. Tolman, American physicist and chemist (d. 1948)
1882 – Nicolae Titulescu, Romanian academic and politician, 61st Romanian Minister of Foreign Affairs (d. 1941)
1883 – Maude Fealy, American actress and screenwriter (d. 1971)
  1883   – Robert Emmett Keane, American actor (d. 1981)
  1883   – Sam Langford, Canadian-American boxer (d. 1956)
1884 – Red Murray, American baseball player (d. 1958)
  1884   – Lee Shumway, American actor (d. 1959)
1886 – Paul Bazelaire, French cellist and composer (d. 1958)
1888 – Rafaela Ottiano, Italian-American actress (d. 1942)
  1888   – Jeff Pfeffer, American baseball player (d. 1972)
  1888   – Emma Richter, German paleontologist (d. 1956)
  1888   – Knute Rockne, American football player and coach (d. 1931)
1889 – Oscar Chisini, Italian mathematician and statistician (d. 1967)
  1889   – Oren E. Long, American soldier and politician, 10th Territorial Governor of Hawaii (d. 1965)
  1889   – Pearl White, American actress (d. 1938)
  1889   – Robert William Wood, English-American painter (d. 1979)
1890 – Norman Bethune, Canadian soldier and physician (d. 1939)
1891 – Dazzy Vance, American baseball player (d. 1961)
1893 – Charles Herbert Colvin, American engineer, co-founded the Pioneer Instrument Company (d. 1985)
  1893   – Adolph Lowe, German sociologist and economist (d. 1995)
1894 – Charles Corm, Lebanese businessman and philanthropist (d. 1963)
1895 – Milt Gross, American animator, director, and screenwriter (d. 1953)
1896 – Kai Holm, Danish actor and director (d. 1985)
1897 – Lefty O'Doul, American baseball player and manager (d. 1969)
1898 – Georges Dumézil, French philologist and academic (d. 1986)
  1898   – Hans Krebs, German general (d. 1945)
1899 – Peter Illing, Austrian born, British film and television actor (d. 1966)
  1899   – Emilio Prados, Spanish poet and author (d. 1962)
1900 – Herbert Biberman, American director and screenwriter (d. 1971)

1901–present
1901 – Wilbur R. Franks, Canadian scientist, invented the g-suit (d. 1986)
  1901   – Charles Goren, American bridge player and author (d. 1991)
  1901   – Jean-Joseph Rabearivelo, Malagasy-French author, poet, and playwright (d. 1937)
1902 – Rachel Messerer, Lithuanian-Russian actress (d. 1993)
  1902   – Russell Reeder, American soldier and author (d. 1998)
1903 – William C. Boyd, American immunologist and chemist (d. 1983)
  1903   – Malcolm Dole, American chemist and academic (d. 1990)
  1903   – Dorothy Mackaill, English-American actress and singer (d. 1990)
  1903   – John Scarne, American magician and author (d. 1985)
1904 – Luis Carrero Blanco, Spanish admiral and politician, 69th President of the Government of Spain (d. 1973)
  1904   – George Gamow, Ukrainian-American physicist and cosmologist (d. 1968)
  1904   – Joseph Schmidt, Austrian-Hungarian tenor and actor (d. 1942)
1906 – Meindert DeJong, Dutch-American soldier and author (d. 1991)
  1906   – Avery Fisher, American violinist and engineer, founded Fisher Electronics (d. 1994)
  1906   – Georges Ronsse, Belgian cyclist and manager (d. 1969)
1907 – Edgar Barrier,  American actor (d. 1964)
1908 – T. R. M. Howard, American surgeon and activist (d. 1976)
  1908   – Thomas Shaw, American singer and guitarist (d. 1977)
1909 – Harry Helmsley, American businessman (d. 1997)
  1909   – George Edward Holbrook, American chemist and engineer (d. 1987)
1910 – Tancredo Neves, Brazilian lawyer and politician, Prime Minister of Brazil (d. 1985)
1911 – Charles Greville, 7th Earl of Warwick, English actor (d. 1984)
1912 – Afro Basaldella, Italian painter and academic (d. 1976)
  1912   – Ferdinand Leitner, German conductor and composer (d. 1996)
  1912   – Carl Marzani, Italian-American activist and publisher (d. 1994)
1913 – Taos Amrouche, Algerian singer and author (d. 1976)
  1913   – John Garfield, American actor and singer (d. 1952)
1914 – Barbara Newhall Follett, American author (d. 1939)
  1914   – Ward Kimball, American animator, producer, and screenwriter (d. 2002)
  1914   – Robert R. Wilson, American physicist, sculptor, and architect (d. 2000)
1915 – László Csatáry, Hungarian art dealer (d. 2013)
  1915   – Frank Sleeman, Australian lieutenant and politician, Lord Mayor of Brisbane (d. 2000)
  1915   – Carlos Surinach, Spanish-Catalan composer and conductor (d. 1997)
1916 – William Alland, American actor, director, and producer (d. 1997)
  1916   – Giorgio Bassani, Italian author and poet (d. 2000)
  1916   – Hans Eysenck, German-English psychologist and theorist (d. 1997)
  1916   – Ernest Titterton, British Australian nuclear physicist (d. 1990)
1917 – Clyde McCullough, American baseball player, coach, and manager (d. 1982)
1918 – Kurt Dahlmann, German pilot, lawyer, and journalist (d. 2017)
  1918   – Margaret Osborne duPont, American tennis player (d. 2012)
1919 – Buck Baker, American race car driver (d. 2002)
  1919   – Tan Chee Khoon, Malaysian physician and politician (d. 1996)
1920 – Jean Lecanuet, French politician, French Minister of Justice (d. 1993)
  1920   – Alan MacNaughtan, Scottish-English actor (d. 2002)
1921 – Halim El-Dabh, Egyptian-American composer and educator (d. 2017)
  1921   – Joan Greenwood, English actress (d. 1987)
  1921   – Dinny Pails, English-Australian tennis player (d. 1986)
1922 – Richard E. Cunha, American director and cinematographer (d. 2005)
  1922   – Dina Pathak, Indian actor and director (d. 2002)
1923 – Russell Freeburg, American journalist and author
  1923   – Francis King, English author and poet (d. 2011)
  1923   – Patrick Moore, English astronomer and television host (d. 2012)
1924 – Kenneth O'Donnell, American soldier and politician (d. 1977)
1925 – Alan R. Battersby, English chemist and academic (d. 2018)
  1925   – Paul Mauriat, French conductor and composer (d. 2006)
1926 – Henri de Contenson, French archaeologist and academic (d. 2019)
  1926   – Prince Michel of Bourbon-Parma, French businessman, soldier and racing driver (d. 2018)
  1926   – Richard DeVos, American businessman and philanthropist, co-founded Amway (d. 2018)
  1926   – Pascual Pérez, Argentinian boxer (d. 1977)
  1926   – Don Rendell, English saxophonist and flute player (d. 2015)
1927 – Phil Batt, American soldier and politician, 29th Governor of Idaho (d. 2023)
  1927   – Thayer David, American actor (d. 1978)
  1927   – Jacques Dupin, French poet and critic (d. 2012)
  1927   – Dick Savitt, American tennis player and businessman (d. 2023)
1928 – Samuel Adler, German-American composer and conductor
  1928   – Alan Sillitoe, English novelist, short story writer, essayist, and poet (d. 2010)
1929 – Bernard Haitink, Dutch violinist and conductor (d. 2021)
  1929   – Peter Swerling, American theoretician and engineer (d. 2000)
1931 – Wally Bruner, American journalist and television host (d. 1997)
  1931   – Bob Johnson, American ice hockey player and coach (d. 1991)
  1931   – William Henry Keeler, American cardinal (d. 2017)
  1931   – Alice Rivlin, American economist and politician (d. 2019)
1932 – Sigurd Jansen, Norwegian pianist, composer, and conductor
  1932   – Ryszard Kapuściński, Polish journalist, photographer, and poet (d. 2007)
  1932   – Miriam Makeba, South African singer-songwriter and actress (d. 2008)
  1932   – Ed Roth, American illustrator (d. 2001)
  1932   – Frank Wells, American businessman (d. 1994)
1933 – Nino Vaccarella, Italian racing driver (d. 2021)
1934 – Mario Davidovsky, Argentinian-American composer and academic (d. 2019)
  1934   – John Duffey, American singer-songwriter and guitarist (d. 1996)
  1934   – Anne Haney, American actress (d. 2001)
  1934   – Barbara McNair, American singer and actress (d. 2007)
  1934   – Sandra Reynolds, South African tennis player
  1934   – Janez Strnad, Slovenian physicist and academic (d. 2015)
1935 – Edward Dębicki, Ukrainian-Polish poet and composer 
  1935   – Bent Larsen, Danish chess player and author (d. 2010)
1936 – Eric Allandale, Dominican trombonist and songwriter  (d. 2001)
  1936   – Jim Clark, Scottish racing driver (d. 1968)
  1936   – Aribert Reimann, German pianist and composer
1937 – José Araquistáin, Spanish footballer
  1937   – William Deverell, Canadian lawyer, author, and activist
  1937   – Graham Dowling, New Zealand cricketer
  1937   – Leslie H. Gelb, American journalist and author (d. 2019)
  1937   – Yuri Senkevich, Russian physician and explorer (d. 2003)
  1937   – Barney Wilen, French saxophonist and composer (d. 1996)
  1937   – Richard B. Wright, Canadian journalist and author (d. 2017)
1938 – Anton Balasingham, Sri Lankan-English negotiator (d. 2006)
  1938   – Alpha Condé, Guinean politician, President of Guinea
  1938   – Allan Kornblum, American police officer and judge (d. 2010)
  1938   – Don Perkins, American football player and sportscaster
  1938   – Paula Prentiss, American actress
  1938   – Adam Daniel Rotfeld, Polish academic and politician, Polish Minister of Foreign Affairs
1939 – Jack Fisher, American baseball player
  1939   – Robert Shaye, American film producer
1940 – Wolfgang Hoffmann-Riem, German scholar and judge
  1940   – David Plante, American novelist
1941 – John Hancock, American film and television actor (d. 1992)
  1941   – Adrian Lyne, English director, producer, and screenwriter
  1941   – James Zagel, American lawyer and judge
1942 – Gloria Gaither, American singer-songwriter 
  1942   – Charles C. Krulak, American general
  1942   – David Matthews, American keyboard player and composer 
  1942   – Lynn Sherr, American journalist and author
  1942   – James Gustave Speth, American lawyer and politician
  1942   – Zorán Sztevanovity, Serbian-Hungarian singer-songwriter and guitarist 
1943 – Lucio Dalla, Italian singer-songwriter and actor (d. 2012)
  1943   – Aldo Rico, Argentinian commander and politician
1944 – Harvey Postlethwaite, English engineer (d. 1999)
  1944   – Anthony Ichiro Sanda, Japanese-American physicist and academic
  1944   – Len Walker, English footballer and manager
  1944   – Bobby Womack, American singer-songwriter (d. 2014)
1945 – Tommy Svensson, Swedish footballer and manager
  1945   – Gary Williams, American basketball player and coach
1946 – Michael Ashcroft, English businessman and politician
  1946   – Danny Frisella, American baseball player (d. 1977)
  1946   – Haile Gerima, Ethiopian born US filmmaker
  1946   – Patricia Kennealy-Morrison, American journalist and author
1947 – David Franzoni, American screenwriter and film producer
  1947   – Jan Garbarek, Norwegian saxophonist and composer
  1947   – Bob Lewis, American guitarist 
  1947   – Pēteris Plakidis, Latvian pianist and composer (d. 2017)
1948 – Lindy Chamberlain-Creighton, New Zealand-Australian author
  1948   – James Ellroy, American writer 
  1948   – Tom Grieve, American baseball player, manager, and sportscaster
  1948   – Mike Moran, English musician, songwriter and record producer
  1948   – Jean O'Leary, American nun and activist (d. 2005)
  1948   – Chris Squire, English singer-songwriter and bass guitarist (d. 2015)
  1948   – Shakin' Stevens, British singer-songwriter 
1949 – Sergei Bagapsh, Abkhazian politician, 2nd President of Abkhazia (d. 2011)
  1949   – Carroll Baker, Canadian singer-songwriter
1950 – Ofelia Medina, Mexican actress and screenwriter
  1950   – Rick Perry, American captain and politician, 47th Governor of Texas
  1950   – Safet Plakalo, Bosnian author and playwright (d. 2015)
1951 – Edelgard Bulmahn, German educator and politician, German Federal Minister of Education and Research
  1951   – Theresa Hak Kyung Cha, South Korean-American author, director, and producer (d. 1982)
  1951   – Kenny Dalglish, Scottish footballer and manager
  1951   – Pete Haycock, English singer-songwriter and guitarist (d. 2013)
  1951   – Peter O'Sullivan, Welsh international footballer
  1951   – Sam Perlozzo, American baseball player and manager
  1951   – Chris Rea, English singer-songwriter and guitarist
  1951   – Glenis Willmott, English scientist and politician
  1951   – Zoran Žižić, Montenegrin politician, 4th Prime Minister of the Federal Republic of Yugoslavia (d. 2013)
1952 – Peter Kuhfeld, English painter
  1952   – Ronn Moss, American singer-songwriter and actor 
  1952   – Svend Robinson, American-Canadian lawyer and politician
  1952   – Umberto Tozzi, Italian singer-songwriter and producer
1953 – John Edwards, Australian director and producer
  1953   – Emilio Estefan, Cuban-American drummer and producer
  1953   – Paweł Janas, Polish footballer and manager
  1953   – Ray Price, Australian rugby player and sportscaster
  1953   – Reinhold Roth, German motorcycle racer
  1953   – Chris Smith, American lawyer and politician
  1953   – Agustí Villaronga, Spanish actor, director, and screenwriter
  1953   – Daniel Woodrell, American novelist and short story writer
1954 – Timur Apakidze, Russian general and pilot (d. 2001)
  1954   – Theresa Hak Kyung Cha, Korean American author (d. 1982)
  1954   – François Fillon, French lawyer and politician, Prime Minister of France
  1954   – Peter Jacobsen, American golfer and sportscaster
  1954   – Catherine O'Hara, Canadian-American actress and comedian
  1954   – Irina Ratushinskaya, Russian poet and author (d. 2017)
1955 – Tim Costello, Australian minister and politician
  1955   – Joey Jones, Welsh footballer and manager
1957 – Nicholas Coleridge, English journalist and businessman
  1957   – Ron Fassler, American film and television actor and author
  1957   – Mykelti Williamson, American actor and director
1958 – Patricia Heaton, American actress 
  1958   – Massimo Mascioletti, Italian rugby player and coach
  1958   – Tina Smith, American politician, junior senator of Minnesota
1959 – Rick Ardon, Australian journalist
  1959   – Plamen Getov, Bulgarian footballer
1960 – Chonda Pierce, American comedian
1961 – Ray Mancini, American boxer
  1961   – Roger Wessels, South African golfer and educator
1963 – Jason Newsted, American heavy metal singer-songwriter and bass player
1964 – Brian Crowley, Irish lawyer and politician
  1964   – Paolo Virzì, Italian director and screenwriter
1965 – Greg Alexander, Australian rugby league player and sportscaster
  1965   – Paul W. S. Anderson, English director, producer, and screenwriter
  1965   – Khaled Hosseini, Afghan-born American novelist
  1965   – Yury Lonchakov, Russian pilot, and cosmonaut
1966 – Emese Hunyady, Hungarian speed skater
  1966   – Kevin Johnson, American basketball player and politician, 55th Mayor of Sacramento
  1966   – Fiona Ma, American accountant and politician
  1966   – Helmut Mayer, Austrian skier
  1966   – Glen Nissen, Australian rugby league player
  1966   – Dav Pilkey, American author and illustrator
  1966   – Grand Puba, American rapper 
  1966   – Mike Small, American golfer and coach
1967 – Daryll Cullinan, South African cricketer and coach
  1967   – Evan Dando, American singer-songwriter and guitarist 
  1967   – Ivan Lewis, English lawyer and politician, Shadow Secretary of State for Northern Ireland
  1967   – Terry Matterson, Australian rugby league player and coach
  1967   – Dave Rayner, English cyclist (d. 1994)
  1967   – Sam Taylor-Johnson, English filmmaker and photographer
  1967   – Kubilay Türkyilmaz, Swiss footballer
  1967   – Tim Vine, English comedian, actor, and author
1968 – Giovanni Carrara, Venezuelan baseball player
  1968   – Jorge Celedón, Colombian singer 
  1968   – Patsy Kensit, English model and actress
  1968   – Kyriakos Mitsotakis, Greek banker and politician, Prime Minister of Greece
  1968   – Graham Westley, English footballer and manager
1969 – Pierluigi Casiraghi, Italian footballer and manager
  1969   – Wayne Collins, English footballer
  1969   – Annie Yi, Taiwanese singer, actress, and writer 
1970 – Àlex Crivillé, Spanish motorcycle racer
  1970   – Will Keen, English actor
  1970   – Caroline Vis, Dutch tennis player
1971 – Iain Baird, Canadian soccer player and manager
  1971   – Claire Baker, Scottish politician
  1971   – Anders Kjølholm, Danish bass player 
  1971   – Satoshi Motoyama, Japanese racing driver
1972 – Katherine Center, American journalist and author
  1972   – Nocturno Culto, Norwegian singer-songwriter and guitarist 
  1972   – Robert Smith, American football player and sportscaster
  1972   – Ivy Queen, Puerto Rican singer, songwriter, rapper, actress and record producer 
  1972   – Jos Verstappen, Dutch racing driver
  1972   – Alison Wheeler, English singer-songwriter 
1973 – Massimo Brambilla, Italian footballer and coach
  1973   – Phillip Daniels, American football player and coach
  1973   – Valery Kobelev, Russian ski jumper
  1973   – Penny Mordaunt, English lieutenant and politician, Minister of State for the Armed Forces
  1973   – Linus of Hollywood, American singer-songwriter and producer 
  1973   – Len Wiseman, American director, producer, and screenwriter
  1973   – Chandra Sekhar Yeleti, Indian director and screenwriter
1974 – Crowbar, American wrestler
  1974   – Mladen Krstajić, Serbian footballer and manager
  1974   – Karol Kučera, Slovak tennis player
  1974   – Ariel Ortega, Argentinian footballer
  1974   – Tommy Phelps, South Korean-American baseball player and coach
  1974   – ICS Vortex, Norwegian singer-songwriter and guitarist 
  1974   – David Wagner, American tennis player and educator
  1974   – Bill Young, Australian rugby player
1975 – Mats Eilertsen, Norwegian bassist and composer 
  1975   – Patrick Femerling, German basketball player
  1975   – Antti Aalto, Finnish ice hockey player
  1975   – Kristi Harrower, Australian basketball player
  1975   – Hawksley Workman, Canadian singer-songwriter and guitarist 
1976 – Robbie Blake, English footballer
  1976   – Tommy Jönsson, Swedish footballer
1977 – Nacho Figueras, Argentinian polo player and model
  1977   – Traver Rains, American fashion designer and photographer
1978 – Pierre Dagenais, Canadian ice hockey player
  1978   – Denis Dallan, Italian rugby player and singer
  1978   – Jean-Marc Pelletier, American ice hockey player
1979 – Sarah Stock, Canadian wrestler and trainer
1980 – Rohan Bopanna, Indian tennis player
  1980   – Omar Bravo, Mexican footballer
  1980   – Suzanna Choffel, American singer-songwriter
  1980   – Giedrius Gustas, Lithuanian basketball player
  1980   – Scott Hamilton, New Zealand rugby player and coach
  1980   – Jack Hannahan, American baseball player
  1980   – Michael Henrich, American ice hockey player
  1980   – Phil McGuire, Scottish footballer and manager
  1980   – Aja Volkman, American singer-songwriter
1981 – Ariza Makukula, Portuguese footballer
  1981   – Helen Wyman, English cyclist
1982 – Landon Donovan, American soccer player and coach
  1982   – Cate Edwards, American lawyer and author
  1982   – Ludmila Ezhova, Russian gymnast
  1982   – Yasemin Mori, Turkish singer
1983 – Samuel Contesti, French-Italian figure skater
  1983   – Adam Deacon, English film actor, rapper, writer and director
  1983   – Jaque Fourie, South African rugby player
  1983   – Drew Houston, American Internet entrepreneur
1984 – Josh Bowman, English actor
  1984   – Tamir Cohen, Israeli footballer
  1984   – Anders Grøndal, Norwegian racing driver
  1984   – Spencer Larsen, American football player
  1984   – Jeremy Loops, South African singer-songwriter and record producer
  1984   – Raven Quinn, American singer-songwriter
  1984   – Zak Whitbread, American-English footballer
1985 – Jake Buxton, English footballer
  1985   – Chinedum Ndukwe, American football player
  1985   – Whitney Port, American fashion designer and author
1986 – Steven Burke, English road and track cyclist
  1986   – Tom De Mul, Belgian footballer
  1986   – Mike Krieger, Brazilian-American computer programmer and businessman, co-founded Instagram
  1986   – Park Min-young, South Korean actress
  1986   – Siim Roops, Estonian footballer
  1986   – Bohdan Shust, Ukrainian footballer
  1986   – Manu Vatuvei, New Zealand rugby league player
  1986   – Margo Harshman, American actress
1987 – Ben McKinley, Australian footballer
  1987   – Cameron Wood, Australian footballer
  1987   – Tamzin Merchant, English actress
1988 – Gal Mekel, Israeli basketball player
  1988   – Laura Siegemund, German tennis player
  1988   – Adam Watts, English footballer
1989 – Benjamin Kiplagat, Ugandan long-distance runner 
1990 – Andrea Bowen, American actress
  1990   – Draymond Green, American basketball player
  1990   – Paddy Madden, Irish footballer
  1990   – Fran Mérida, Spanish footballer
1992 – Nick Castellanos, American baseball player
  1992   – Erik Lamela, Argentinian international footballer
  1992   – Bernd Leno, German footballer
  1992   – Karl Mööl, Estonian footballer
1993 – Bobbi Kristina Brown, American singer and actress (d. 2015)
  1993   – Richard Peniket, English footballer
1994 – Callum Harriott, English footballer
  1994   – AJ Tracey, British hip-hop artist and record producer
1995 – Chlöe Howl, British singer-songwriter
  1995   – Bill Milner, English actor
1996 – Lukas Webb, Australian rules footballer
2001 – Freya Anderson, English freestyle swimmer
2002 – Jacob Hopkins, American actor
2007 – Miya Cech, American actress

Deaths

Pre-1600
 306 – Adrian and Natalia of Nicomedia, Christian martyrs
 480 – Landry of Sées, French bishop and saint
 561 – Pelagius I, pope of the Catholic Church
 934 – Abdullah al-Mahdi Billah, Fatimid caliph (b. 873)
1172 – Stephen III, king of Hungary (b. 1147)
1193 – Saladin, founder of the Ayyubid Sultanate (b. 1137)
1238 – Joan of England, queen of Scotland (b. 1210)
  1238   – Yuri II, Russian Grand Prince (b. 1189)
1303 – Daniel of Moscow, Russian Grand Duke (b. 1261)
1314 – Jakub Świnka, Polish priest and archbishop
1371 – Jeanne d'Évreux, queen consort of France (b. 1310)
1388 – Thomas Usk, English author
1484 – Saint Casimir, Polish prince (b. 1458)
1496 – Sigismund, archduke of Austria (b. 1427)
1556 – Leonhard Kleber, German organist (b. 1495)
1583 – Bernard Gilpin, English priest and theologian (b. 1517)

1601–1900
1604 – Fausto Sozzini, Italian theologian and educator (b. 1539)
1615 – Hans von Aachen, German painter and educator (b. 1552)
1710 – Louis III, duke of Bourbon (b. 1668)
1733 – Claude de Forbin, French admiral and politician (b. 1656)
1744 – John Anstis, English historian and politician (b. 1669)
1762 – Johannes Zick, German painter (b. 1702)
1793 – Louis Jean Marie de Bourbon, Duke of Penthièvre (b. 1725)
1795 – John Collins, American politician, 3rd Governor of Rhode Island (b. 1717)
1805 – Jean-Baptiste Greuze, French painter (b. 1725)
1807 – Abraham Baldwin, American minister, lawyer, and politician (b. 1754)
1811 – Mariano Moreno, Argentinian journalist, lawyer, and politician (b. 1778)
1832 – Jean-François Champollion, French philologist and scholar (b. 1790)
1851 – James Richardson, English explorer (b. 1809)
1852 – Nikolai Gogol, Ukrainian-Russian short story writer, novelist, and playwright (b. 1809)
1853 – Thomas Bladen Capel, English admiral (b. 1776)
  1853   – Christian Leopold von Buch, German geologist and paleontologist (b. 1774)
1858 – Matthew C. Perry, American naval commander (b. 1794)
1864 – Thomas Starr King, American minister and politician (b. 1824)
1866 – Alexander Campbell, Irish-American minister and theologian (b. 1788)
1872 – Carsten Hauch, Danish poet and playwright (b. 1790)
1883 – Alexander H. Stephens, American lawyer and politician, Vice President of the Confederate States of America (b. 1812)
1888 – Amos Bronson Alcott, American philosopher and educator (b. 1799)

1901–present
1903 – Joseph Henry Shorthouse, English author (b. 1834)
1906 – John Schofield, American general and politician, 28th United States Secretary of War (b. 1831)
1915 – William Willett, English inventor, founded British Summer Time (b. 1856)
1916 – Franz Marc, German painter (b. 1880)
1925 – Moritz Moszkowski, Polish-German pianist and composer (b. 1854)
  1925   – James Ward, English psychologist and philosopher (b. 1843)
  1925   – John Montgomery Ward, American baseball player and manager (b. 1860)
1927 – Ira Remsen, American chemist and academic (b. 1846)
1938 – George Foster Peabody, American banker and philanthropist (b. 1852)
  1938   – Jack Taylor, American baseball player (b. 1874)
1940 – Hamlin Garland, American novelist, poet, essayist, and short story writer (b. 1860)
1941 – Ludwig Quidde, German activist and politician, Nobel Prize laureate (b. 1858)
1944 – Fannie Barrier Williams, American educator and activist (b. 1855)
  1944   – Louis Buchalter, American mob boss (b. 1897)
  1944   – Louis Capone, Italian-American gangster (b. 1896)
  1944   – René Lefebvre, French businessman (b. 1879)
1945 – Lucille La Verne, American actress (b. 1872)
  1945   – Mark Sandrich, American director, producer, and screenwriter (b. 1900)
1948 – Antonin Artaud, French actor and director (b. 1896)
1949 – Clarence Kingsbury, English cyclist (b. 1882)
1952 – Charles Scott Sherrington, English neurophysiologist and pathologist, Nobel Prize laureate (b. 1857)
1954 – Noel Gay, English composer and songwriter (b. 1898)
1960 – Herbert O'Conor, American soldier, lawyer, and politician, 51st Governor of Maryland (b. 1896)
1963 – William Carlos Williams, American poet, short story writer, and essayist (b. 1883)
1969 – Nicholas Schenck, Russian-American businessman (b. 1881)
1972 – Harold Barrowclough, New Zealand general, lawyer, and politician, 8th Chief Justice of New Zealand (b. 1894)
  1972   – Charles Biro, American author and illustrator (b. 1911)
1974 – Adolph Gottlieb, American painter and sculptor (b. 1903)
1976 – John Marvin Jones, American judge and politician (b. 1882)
  1976   – Walter H. Schottky, Swiss-German physicist and engineer (b. 1886)
1977 – Anatol E. Baconsky, Romanian poet, author, and critic (b. 1925)
  1977   – Nancy Tyson Burbidge, Australian botanist and curator (b. 1912)
  1977   – Andrés Caicedo, Colombian author, poet, and playwright (b. 1951)
  1977   – William Paul, American lawyer and politician (b. 1885)
  1977   – Lutz Graf Schwerin von Krosigk, German jurist and politician, German Minister for Foreign Affairs (b. 1887)
1978 – Wesley Bolin, American businessman and politician, 15th Governor of Arizona (b. 1909)
  1978   – Joe Marsala, American clarinet player and songwriter (b. 1907)
1979 – Willi Unsoeld, American mountaineer and educator (b. 1926)
1980 – Alan Hardaker, English lieutenant and businessman (b. 1912)
1981 – Torin Thatcher, American actor (b. 1905)
  1981   – Karl-Jesko von Puttkamer, German admiral (b. 1900)
1986 – Albert L. Lehninger, American biochemist and academic (b. 1917)
  1986   – Richard Manuel, Canadian singer-songwriter and pianist (b. 1943)
  1986   – Elizabeth Smart, Canadian poet and author (b. 1913)
1987 – Seibo Kitamura, Japanese sculptor (b. 1884)
1988 – Beatriz Guido, Argentine author and screenwriter (b. 1924)
1989 – Tiny Grimes, American guitarist (b. 1916)
1990 – Hank Gathers, American basketball player (b. 1967)
1991 – Godfrey Bryan, English cricketer (b. 1902)
1992 – Art Babbitt, American animator and director (b. 1907)
  1992   – Pare Lorentz, American director, producer, and screenwriter (b. 1905)
1993 – Art Hodes, Ukrainian-American pianist and composer (b. 1904)
  1993   – Tomislav Ivčić, Croatian singer-songwriter and politician (b. 1953)
  1993   – Izaak Kolthoff, Dutch chemist and academic (b. 1894)
  1993   – Nicholas Ridley, Baron Ridley of Liddesdale, English lieutenant and politician, Secretary of State for the Environment (b. 1929)
1994 – John Candy, Canadian comedian and actor (b. 1950)
  1994   – George Edward Hughes, Irish-Scottish philosopher and author (b. 1918)
1995 – Matt Urban, American colonel, Medal of Honor recipient (b. 1919)
1996 – Minnie Pearl, American entertainer (b. 1912)
  1996   – John Sauer, American football player, coach, and sportscaster (b. 1925)
1997 – Joe Baker-Cresswell, English captain (b. 1901)
  1997   – Robert H. Dicke, American physicist and astronomer (b. 1916)
1998 – Ivan Dougherty, Australian general (b. 1907)
1999 – Harry Blackmun, American lawyer and judge (b. 1908)
  1999   – Del Close, American actor and educator (b. 1934)
  1999   – Miłosz Magin, Polish pianist and composer (b. 1929)
2000 – Hermann Brück, German-Scottish physicist and astronomer (b. 1905)
  2000   – Michael Noonan, New Zealand-Australian author and screenwriter (b. 1921)
  2000   – Ta-You Wu, Chinese physicist and academic (b. 1907)
2001 – Gerardo Barbero, Argentinian chess player (b. 1961)
  2001   – Jean René Bazaine, French painter and author (b. 1904)
  2001   – Fred Lasswell, American cartoonist (b. 1916)
  2001   – Jim Rhodes, American businessman and politician, 61st Governor of Ohio (b. 1909)
  2001   – Harold Stassen, American educator and politician, 25th Governor of Minnesota (b. 1907)
2002 – Ugnė Karvelis, Lithuanian author and translator (b. 1935)
  2002   – Elyne Mitchell, Australian skier and author (b. 1913)
  2002   – Velibor Vasović, Serbian footballer and manager (b. 1939)
2003 – Jaba Ioseliani, Georgian playwright, academic, and politician (b. 1926)
  2003   – Sébastien Japrisot, French author, screenwriter, and director (b. 1931)
2004 – Claude Nougaro, French singer-songwriter (b. 1929)
2005 – Nicola Calipari, Italian general (b. 1953)
  2005   – Yuriy Kravchenko, Ukrainian police officer and politician (b. 1951)
  2005   – Carlos Sherman, Uruguayan-Belarusian author and activist (b. 1934)
2006 – John Reynolds Gardiner, American author and engineer (b. 1944)
  2006   – Edgar Valter, Estonian author and illustrator (b. 1929)
2007 – Thomas Eagleton, American lawyer and politician, 38th Lieutenant Governor of Missouri (b. 1929)
  2007   – Tadeusz Nalepa, Polish singer-songwriter and guitarist (b. 1934)
  2007   – Ian Wooldridge, English journalist (b. 1932)
2008 – Gary Gygax, American game designer, co-created Dungeons & Dragons (b. 1938)
  2008   – Leonard Rosenman, American composer and conductor (b. 1924)
2009 – Yvon Cormier, Canadian wrestler (b. 1938)	
  2009   – Horton Foote, American playwright and screenwriter (b. 1916)	
  2009   – George McAfee, American football player (b. 1918)	
2010 – Raimund Abraham, Austrian architect and educator, designed the Austrian Cultural Forum New York (b. 1933)
  2010   – Johnny Alf, Brazilian pianist and composer (b. 1929)
  2010   – Vladislav Ardzinba, Abkhazian historian and politician, 1st President of Abkhazia (b. 1945)
  2010   – Fred Wedlock, English singer-songwriter and guitarist (b. 1942)
2011 – Krishna Prasad Bhattarai, Nepalese journalist and politician, 29th Prime Minister of Nepal (b. 1924)
  2011   – Vivienne Harris, English journalist and publisher, co-founded the Jewish Telegraph (b. 1921)
  2011   – Ed Manning, American basketball player and coach (b. 1943)
  2011   – Arjun Singh, Indian politician (b. 1930)
  2011   – Alenush Terian, Iranian astronomer and physicist (b. 1920)
  2011   – Simon van der Meer, Dutch-Swiss physicist and academic, Nobel Prize laureate (b. 1925)
2012 – Paul McBride, Scottish lawyer and politician (b. 1965)	
  2012   – Don Mincher, American baseball player (b. 1938)	
2013 – Lillian Cahn, Hungarian-American businesswoman, co-founded Coach, Inc. (b. 1923)
  2013   – Mickey Moore, Canadian-American actor and director (b. 1914)
  2013   – Toren Smith, Canadian businessman, founded Studio Proteus (b. 1960)
2014 – Mark Freidkin, Russian author and poet (b. 1953)
  2014   – Elaine Kellett-Bowman, English lawyer and politician (b. 1923)
  2014   – Jack Kinzler, American engineer (b. 1920)
  2014   – Wu Tianming, Chinese director and producer (b. 1939)
2015 – Dušan Bilandžić, Croatian historian and politician (b. 1924)
  2015   – Ray Hatton, English-American runner, author, and academic (b. 1932)
2016 – Bud Collins, American journalist and sportscaster (b. 1929)
  2016   – Pat Conroy, American author (b. 1945)
  2016   – P. A. Sangma, Indian lawyer and politician, Speaker of the Lok Sabha (b. 1947)
  2016   – Zhou Xiaoyan, Chinese soprano and educator (b. 1917)
2017 – Clayton Yeutter, American politician (b. 1930)
2018 – Davide Astori, Italian soccer player (b. 1987)
2019 – Keith Flint, English singer (The Prodigy) (b. 1969)
  2019   – Luke Perry, American actor (b. 1966)
2020 – Javier Pérez de Cuéllar, Peruvian politician and diplomat (b. 1920)
2022 – Rod Marsh, Australian cricketer and coach (b. 1947)
  2022   – Shane Warne, Australian cricketer, coach, and sportscaster (b. 1969)
2023 – Phil Batt, American soldier and politician, 29th Governor of Idaho (b. 1927)

Holidays and observances
Christian feast day:
Adrian of Nicomedia
Casimir
Felix of Rhuys
Giovanni Antonio Farina (Catholic Church)
Blessed Humbert III, Count of Savoy (Roman Catholic Church)
Paul Cuffee (Episcopal Church)
Peter of Pappacarbone
Blessed Zoltán Meszlényi
March 4 (Eastern Orthodox liturgics)
St Casimir's Day (Poland and Lithuania)
 World Obesity Day

References

External links

 BBC: On This Day
 
 Historical Events on March 4

Days of the year
March